Nancy Carillo de la Paz (born January 11, 1986 in Havana) is a volleyball player from Cuba.

She represented her native country at the 2004 Summer Olympics in Athens, Greece, where she won the bronze medal with the national team in the women's team competition. She participated in the 2006 FIVB Volleyball Women's World Championship.

Carrillo was named the Women's Best Server at the 2002 World Championship.

Awards

Individuals
 2002 Pan-American Cup "Best Spiker"
 2002 Pan-American Cup "Best Server"
 2002 World Championship "Best Server"
 2003 Pan-American Games "Best Attacker"
 2005 FIVB World Grand Prix "Best Blocker"
 2005 NORCECA Championship "Best Server"
 2006 FIVB World Grand Prix "Best Server"
 2007 FIVB World Cup "Best Spiker"
 2007 Pan-American Games "Most Valuable Player"
 2007 NORCECA Championship "Most Valuable Player"
 2007 NORCECA Championship "Best Spiker"
 2007 NORCECA Championship "Best Blocker"
 2007 Pan-American Cup "Most Valuable Player"
 2007 Pan-American Cup "Best Attacker"
 2007 Pan-American Cup "Best Server"
 2007 Montreux Volley Masters "Most Valuable Player"
 2008 Montreux Volley Masters "Best Blocker"
 2009 NORCECA Championship "Best Blocker"

Notes

References
 
 FIVB profile
 CEV profile

1986 births
Living people
Cuban women's volleyball players
Volleyball players at the 2004 Summer Olympics
Volleyball players at the 2008 Summer Olympics
Olympic bronze medalists for Cuba
Olympic volleyball players of Cuba
Olympic medalists in volleyball
Volleyball players at the 2003 Pan American Games
Volleyball players at the 2007 Pan American Games
Pan American Games silver medalists for Cuba
Pan American Games gold medalists for Cuba
Sportspeople from Havana
Medalists at the 2004 Summer Olympics
Pan American Games medalists in volleyball
Central American and Caribbean Games silver medalists for Cuba
Competitors at the 2006 Central American and Caribbean Games
Middle blockers
Opposite hitters
Central American and Caribbean Games medalists in volleyball
Medalists at the 2003 Pan American Games
Medalists at the 2007 Pan American Games